Justice Jackson may refer to:

Three justices of the U.S. Supreme Court:
Ketanji Brown Jackson (born 1970), associate justice
Robert H. Jackson (1892–1954), associate justice
Howell Edmunds Jackson (1832–1895), associate justice
Amos W. Jackson (1904–1972), associate justice of the Indiana Supreme Court
Andrew Jackson (1767–1845), associate justice of the Tennessee Supreme Court
Barbara Jackson (born 1961), associate justice of the North Carolina Supreme Court
James Jackson (congressman) (1819–1887), chief justice of the Supreme Court of Georgia
Joseph Raymond Jackson (1880–1969), commissioner for the Montana Supreme Court
Mortimer M. Jackson (1809–1889), associate justice of the Wisconsin Supreme Court
Rupert Jackson (born 1948), Lord Justice of Appeal of the Court of Appeal of England and Wales
Schuyler W. Jackson (1904–1964), associate justice of the Kansas Supreme Court

See also
Judge Jackson (disambiguation)